An Phú is a district of An Giang province in the Mekong Delta region of Vietnam and shares the international border with Cambodia. An Phú juts out at the western edge of Vietnam into Cambodia. As of 2003 the district had a population of 178,613. The district covers an area of 226 km². The district capital lies at An Phú town.

History

The district is one of the most remote places in Vietnam. An Phú was a part of the Tầm Phong Long region that had links with former Funan kingdom and was given to the Nguyễn lords in 1757 by Chenla king Outey II.

Due to favorable conditions for agricultural cultivation and transport by water, the Vietnamese settled in the district area. The region was an important route in the trade, business strategy, and also strategically.

In May 1833 during the Siamese-Vietnamese war, the Siamese soldiers across the district on the river to attack Dai Nam. In 1841, many Chams people in Cambodia went to the district to avoid the war in Cambodia.

In the Daniel Marvin's book Expendable Elite – One Soldier's Journey into Covert Warfare, he talked about the time he worked there in the Special Forces in 1965–1966. Their camp Dan Nam camped in An Phú town and they organized a group of militant Hòa Hảo forces to support them. He said: "An Phú is the safest place all Vietnam".

There was military invasion from 1977–78 by Pol Pot and the Khmer Rouge army. Almost all of the people in An Phú had to be evacuated (mainly to the Chợ Mới and Phú Tân districts). The resultant damage was non-significant.

Administrative divisions
The district is divided into two urban municipalities, An Phú and Long Bình, and 12 rural communes. These are:

Khánh An
Phú Hữu
Vĩnh Lộc
Vĩnh Hậu
Nhơn Hội
Phú Hội
Vĩnh Hội Đông
Khánh Bình
Quốc Thái
Phước Hưng
Đa Phước
Vĩnh Trường
Before 1975 An Phú was a part of Long Châu Tiền, but An Phú District then separated, following the 1975 merger with Tân Châu district of Phú Châu. By the year 1992 it was fully separated into the An Phú District of today.

People 

Most of the people in An Phú District are ethnic Kinh (Vietnamese).

There are about 12,000 Chams people, who mostly live in 5 villages: Đa Phước, Vĩnh Trương, Nhơn Hội, Khánh Bình and Quốc Thái.

Monsoonal flooding
Located near Châu Đốc, An Phú district is famous for its rice and fish during the monsoonal flood season. The food comes in the seventh lunar month, roughly in August. The local government organises the Flood Season Festival annually. When the monsoonal season comes, many villages and ricefields are inundated by water. Many houses were built on stilts to protect themselves against flooding. Although produce cannot be grown during this season, the fishing catch is plentiful, and boats are the dominant mode of transport during this season.

Economy
Residents of An Phú District are mainly farmers; most of the area is under rice cultivation with alluvium soil and freshwater which also allows much fishing. Every year, when all the communes are affected by water the fields become inundated. On the Cambodian border on the other side, opposite the town of Long Bình is a market area of Cambodia known as Chrey Thum (Koh Thum).

As the road from An Phú to the capital Phnom Penh is Cambodia's most recent road from Vietnam, it has created good conditions for trade in the region.

Education
All communes and towns have schools from kindergarten to middle school.

Gallery

References

Districts of An Giang province
An Giang province